Barynotus is a genus in the weevil family (Curculionidae).

Description
This genus includes fairly large weevil. They feed on vegetation.

Species
Barynotus affinis Solari, 1943 
Barynotus alternans Boheman, 1834 
Barynotus balianii Solari, 1943 
Barynotus cantabricus González, 1972 
Barynotus conjux Daniel & Daniel, 1898 
Barynotus fairmairei Tournier, 1876 
Barynotus hungaricus (Tournier, 1876) 
Barynotus ibericus González, 1972 
Barynotus liguricus Solari, 1943 
Barynotus maculatus Boheman, 1842 
Barynotus mainardii Solari, 1943 
Barynotus mainardii alpicola Pesarini & Pedroni, 2011
Barynotus makolskii Smreczynski, 1956 
Barynotus mancinii Solari, 1943 
Barynotus margaritaceus Germar, 1824 
Barynotus maritimus Hustache, 1920 
Barynotus moerens (Fabricius, 1792) 
Barynotus monguzzii Pesarini & Pedroni, 2011
Barynotus montandoni Pic, 1899) 
Barynotus obscurus (Fabricius, 1775) 
Barynotus sabulosus (Olivier, 1807) 
Barynotus schoenherri (Zetterstedt, 1838) 
Barynotus scutatus Desbrochers, 1892 
Barynotus solarii Mainardi, 1907 
Barynotus squamosus Germar, 1824 
Barynotus umbilicatus Dufour, 1851 
Barynotus unipunctatus Dufour, 1851

References
  Fauna Europaea
 EoL
 GBIF

Entiminae